The 2009 Miami mayoral election took place on November 3, 2009, to elect the mayor of Miami, Florida. The election was officially nonpartisan, and held in conjunction with other city elections City Commissioner Tomás Regalado was elected by a large margin over City Commissioner Joe Sanchez.

References

2009
2009 United States mayoral elections
2009 Florida elections
Mayoral election, 2009